Markus Breitschmid (born 20 April 1966, Lucerne, Switzerland) is a Swiss-American architectural theoretician and the author of several books on contemporary architecture and philosophical aesthetics. His most highly regarded books are Der bauende Geist. Friedrich Nietzsche und die Architektur (2001), The Significance of the Idea (2008, first print), and Non-Referential Architecture (2018, first edition). His writings have been translated into Chinese, English, French, German, Hindi, Italian, Japanese, Korean, Russian, and Spanish. Breitschmid has been invited to contribute to the Venice Biennale of Architecture, the Architecture Biennale of Chicago, and the Triennale of Architecture in Lisbon.

Biography
Breitschmid is a professor of architecture at Virginia Polytechnic Institute and State University (Virginia Tech) since 2004. He holds a visiting professorship at the Universidad de Piura (UDEP), located in Piura and Lima, Peru since 2020. Previously, among other academic appointments, he was the "2003 Visiting Historian for the History of Architecture and Urbanism" at Cornell University and taught at the University of North Carolina and the Catholic University of America. In 2016, Breitschmid was appointed to the diploma commission of the Accademia di Architettura di Mendrisio. He has been a visiting lecturer and visiting critic at many universities, museums, and professional associations in Americas, Europe, and Asia.

Breitschmid holds a military as well as a civil education. He completed his training as an Artillery Officer in the Swiss Armed Forces in 1987. He served in the Mechanized Artillery of the Swiss Army in the rank of a First Lieutenant. Breitschmid received his architectural education in Switzerland, the United States and Germany. He is a registered architect in Switzerland and a member of the Swiss Institute of Architects and Engineers. He received his Philosophiae Doctor (Ph.D.) in engineering science from the Technische Universität Berlin, where he was the first doctoral student of the architectural theoretician Fritz Neumeyer.

Breitschmid was born and raised in Lucerne, Switzerland. He has been a permanent US resident since 1998. Breitschmid is a citizen of the United States of America and Switzerland.

Writings on architecture 
Breitschmid's writing concerns the aesthetic mentality of modernism and contemporary architecture. Among other subjects, Breitschmid has written books on the German philosopher Friedrich Nietzsche's thoughts on building, contemporary architecture, and on Non-Referential Architecture. Breitschmid has written several essays on the work of Bruno Taut.

Breitschmid submitted his doctoral dissertation "Der Baugedanke bei Friedrich Nietzsche" at the Technische Universität Berlin in 1999; it was subsequently published as a German-language book titled Der bauende Geist. Friedrich Nietzsche und die Architektur (The Building Spirit. Friedrich Nietzsche and Architecture). Together with books on Nietzsche by Fritz Neumeyer and Tilmann Buddensieg, Der bauende Geist became the foundation for scholarship on the subject of Nietzsche and architecture. Der bauende Geist was included in Hanno-Walter Kruft's "A History of Architectural Theory from Vitruvius to the Present" for the revised 2013 edition.

Subsequently, Breitschmid's publications have dealt with such subjects as contemporary Swiss architecture, Bruno Taut, Tectonics in Architecture, and Theories of Interpretation.

Since 2006, Breitschmid has made a name for himself by means of a sustained collaboration with architect Valerio Olgiati on numerous publications that took on the form of books, essays, and interviews. In her 2012 book Forms of Practice, the Romanian-British architecture historian Irina Davidovici argues that the thesis "The Significance of the Idea" is pertinent for all of the contemporary architecture of “post-enlightenment culture.”

Since 2013, Breitschmid propagates Non-Referential Architecture as a response to a contemporary societal current that increasingly rejects ideologies of any kind, political and otherwise. The first use of the term Non-Referential appears in a reprint of an interview between Olgiati and Breitschmid in the Italian journal Domus. In 2014, Breitschmid published a rebuttal titled "Architecture is Derived from Architecture" (published in German language) in the Swiss journal Werk, Bauen + Wohnen, thereby responding to an architectural claim made by others that attempts to imbue meaning into architecture from the extra-architectural.

Breitschmid wrote the book Non-Referential Architecture, a treatise on contemporary architecture, that was published in 2018. It analyses the societal currents of the early 21st century and argues that those currents are radically different from the epoch of postmodernity. The book proposes a new framework for architecture and defines the seven underlying principles – 1) experience of space, 2) oneness, 3) newness, 4) construction, 5) contradiction, 6) order, 7) sensemaking – for a Non-Referential Architecture. The book has been published in several languages since its first appearance.

Published works (selection)

As author 
Der bauende Geist. Friedrich Nietzsche und die Architektur. Quart, 2001. 
Can Architectural Art-Form be Designed Out Of Construction? Architecture Edition, 2004. 
Nietzsche's Denkraum. Edition Didacta, 2006. Hardcover:  Paperback: 
Between Object and Culture, in: Wolkenkuckucksheim - Cloud-Cuckoo-Land - Vozdushnyi zamo. Eduard Fuehr (ed.), Cottbus: No. 2/2007.
Three Architects in Switzerland: Beat Consoni – Morger & Degalo – Valerio Olgiati. Quart, 2008. 
Un’architettura che, in fondo, e ‘solo’ astratta, in: Casabella. Francesco Dal Co (ed.), Milano: 72/No.770, 2008, pp. 8–9; 107–108.
The Significance of the Idea. The Architecture of Valerio Olgiati. / Die Bedeutung der Idee. Die Architektur von Valerio Olgiati. Niggli Verlag, 2008. 
El Inventorio Conceptual de Valerio Olgiati / Valerio Olgiati's Ideational Inventory in: El Croquis No.156, 2011. 
The Architect as 'Molder of the Sensibilities of the General Public': Bruno Taut and his Architekturprogramm. in: The Art of Social Critique. Painting Mirrors of Social Life, Lexington Books, 2012. 
Christ & Gantenbein. Around the Corner. Hatje & Cantz, 2012.  [co-authored with Victoria Easton]
Architektur leitet sich von Architektur ab. in: Werk, Bauen + Wohnen, No. 9, Zürich, 2014. 
Mais Além!. in: Valerio Olgiati. Indexnewspaper, No. 5, Porto, 2016. 
Bruno Taut - Glass House at Cologne. in: Harry Francis Mallgrave, David Leatherbarrow, Alexander Eisenschmidt (eds.) The Companions to the History of Architecture, Volume IV, Twentieth-Century Architecture, John Wiley & Sons, Inc., London, 2017. 
Non-Referential Architecture. Ideated by Valerio Olgiati; Written by Markus Breitschmid. Basel: Simonett & Baer 2018 
Nicht-Referenzielle Architektur. Gedacht von Valerio Olgiati; Geschrieben von Markus Breitschmid. Basel: Simonett & Baer 2018 
Non-Referential Architecture. Ideated by Valerio Olgiati; Written by Markus Breitschmid. 2nd edition, Zurich: Park Books 2019 
Nicht-Referenzielle Architektur. Gedacht von Valerio Olgiati; Geschrieben von Markus Breitschmid. 2. Auflage, Zürich: Park Books 2019 
Architettura Non-Referenziale. Ideato da Valerio Olgiati; Scritto da Markus Breitschmid. Zurich: Park Books 2019 
"Architektur der Berge": Bruno Taut. in: Thinking in Thin Air. Anthology of a Decade Engadin Art Talks, Zurich: Lars Müller Publishers 2020 
Arquitectura No-Referencial. Ideado por Valerio Olgiati; Escrito por Markus Breitschmid. Ciudad de México: Arquine 2020 
Ogni edificio esiste per se stesso. in: Domus. No.1054, Milano, 2021 
Architecture Non-Référentielle. Idéé par Valerio Olgiati; Ecrit par Markus Breitschmid. Marseille: Cosa Mentale 2021

As editor 
Conversation with Students – Valerio Olgiati. Virginia Tech Architecture Publications, 2007. 
A Modern Milieu – Julius Meier-Graefe. Architectura et Ars Series, Volume 1, Virginia Tech Architecture Publications, 2007. 
Thoughts on Building. Corporis Publisher for Architecture, Art, and Photography, 2008. 
K + N House at Wollerau – Valerio Olgiati. Architecture Case Study, Volume 11, Corporis Publisher for Architecture, Art, and Photography, 2009. 
Olgiati. English Edition. Birkhäuser, 2011.  (text edited with Leina Gonzalez; also available in German, French, Italian, Spanish, and Japanese editions)
Seattle Central Library – Rem Kohlhaas. Architecture History Case Study No.15, Corporis Publisher for Architecture, Art, and Photography, 2013. 
Architecture and the Ambient – Mario Botta. Architectura et Ars Series, Volume 2, Virginia Tech Architecture Publications, 2013.

References

External links
Virginia Tech Website
German National Library; Markus Breitschmid
Markus Breitschmid publications

1966 births
Living people
Architectural theoreticians
Swiss architects
20th-century American architects
Swiss architectural historians
American architectural historians
Virginia Tech faculty
People from Lucerne
21st-century American architects